SM U-156 was a German Type U 151 U-boat commissioned in 1917 for the Imperial German Navy. From 1917 until her disappearance in September 1918 she was part of the U-Kreuzer Flotilla, and was responsible for sinking 45 ships and damaging two others. She took part in the Attack on Orleans.

Background
U-156, built by the Atlas Werke in Bremen, was originally one of seven  class U-boats designed to carry cargo between the United States and Germany in 1916. Five of the submarine freighters were converted into long-range cruiser U-boats (U-kreuzers) equipped with two  SK L/45 deck guns, including U-156. They were the largest U-boats of World War I.

Service history
U-156 was launched on 17 April 1917 and commissioned on 22 August 1917 under the experienced U-boat ace Konrad Gansser, who commanded her until June 1918, following which Richard Feldt took command until the U-156 was lost in September 1918.

On 17 January 1918, Gansser's U-156 entered isolated Naos Bay in the Spanish Canary Islands. The U-156 was scheduled to meet with the U-157 and a small Spanish flagged merchant vessel in an attempt to transit prohibited materials past the British blockade to Germany. The British learned of the meeting through decoded signals and ambushed the U-156 in a failed attempt to sink the U-boat. The British submarine  had actually hit the U-156 with a torpedo but the torpedo had failed to explode.

On 15 June 1918,  U-156 sailed with 77 crew. She passed through the North Sea, negotiated the Northern Passage around the northern end of the British Isles, and out into the Atlantic Ocean where she sailed for Long Island. She then proceeded to New York Harbor, where she had been ordered to lay mines. Records show that she was to lay a field of mines in the shipping lane along the south shore of Long Island, just east of the Fire Island lightship.

Captain Rasmus Emil Halvorsen and her crew were rescued from the lifeboats after 27 hours by DS Anchites of Liverpool, England.

A mine laid by U-156 is often credited with the loss of the cruiser USS San Diego on 19 July 1918, ten miles southeast of Fire Island, New York.

On 21 July 1918 U-156 opened fire on a beach and marsh within the boundaries of the American town of Orleans, Massachusetts, and several nearby merchant vessels. The bombardment of the beach may have been a case of overshooting the targeted maritime vessels. In the end, the U-156 severely damaged a tugboat and sank four barges. HS-1L flying boats and R-9 seaplanes were dispatched from the Chatham Naval Air Station and bombed the enemy raider with bombs that failed to explode. The U-156 returned fire with her deck guns in an unsuccessful attempt to down the aircraft. It was the first time in history that American aviators engaged an enemy vessel in the western Atlantic. The Attack on Orleans was the only Central Powers raid mounted against the United States mainland during World War I and the first time the Continental United States was shelled by a foreign power's artillery since the Siege of Fort Texas in 1846.

U-156 had meanwhile headed north to attack the US fishing fleet. She sank 21 fishing boats in the Gulf of Maine area, from Cape Cod to the Bay of Fundy, ranging from the  ton schooner Nelson A. (4 August) to the 766 GRT Dornfontein (2 August).

U-156 has been credited with the sinking of the tanker Luz Blanca, just off the headlands of Halifax on August 5/1918.  On 20 August, U-156 captured the Canadian trawler Triumph southwest of Canso, Nova Scotia. They manned and armed the vessel, and used it in conjunction with the submarine to capture and sink seven other fishing boats in the Grand Banks area, before eventually scuttling her.

Fate
On 25 September 1918 and in the following days, U-156 failed to report that she had cleared the Northern barrage minefield between the United Kingdom and Norway on her return voyage to Germany. U-156 is presumed to have struck a mine of the Northern Barrage during the last leg of her cruise. Prior to her arrival at the northern end of the barrage she had radioed the estimated time and exact route she planned to take through the mines. The British intercepted this message, decoded it, and sent a submarine to ambush U-156. U-156 escaped the trap by diving but likely attempted to transit the barrage while underwater. The 77 crew on board were never heard from again.

Summary of raiding history

References

Notes

Citations

Bibliography

External links

German Type U 151 submarines
U-boats commissioned in 1917
U-boats sunk in 1918
Maritime incidents in 1918
World War I submarines of Germany
1917 ships
Ships lost with all hands
World War I shipwrecks in the North Sea